6th BSFC Awards
January 26, 1986

Best Film: 
 Ran 
The 6th Boston Society of Film Critics Awards honored the best filmmaking of 1985. The awards were given on 26 January 1986.

Winners
Best Film:
Ran
Best Actor:
Jack Nicholson – Prizzi's Honor
Best Actress:
Geraldine Page – The Trip to Bountiful
Best Supporting Actor:
Ian Holm – Wetherby, Brazil, Dance with a Stranger and Dreamchild
Best Supporting Actress:
Anjelica Huston – Prizzi's Honor
Best Director:
John Huston – Prizzi's Honor
Best Screenplay:
Woody Allen – The Purple Rose of Cairo
Best Cinematography:
Takao Saitô and Masaharu Ueda – Ran
Best Documentary:
Shoah
Best English-Language Film:
Prizzi's Honor

External links
Past Winners

References 
1985 Boston Society of Film Critics Awards Internet Movie Database
 

1985
1985 film awards
1985 awards in the United States
1985 in Boston
January 1986 events in the United States